Imagine Prep Coolidge is a charter junior high and high school in Coolidge, Arizona. It is operated by Imagine Schools.

The school recently became a full member of the Arizona Interscholastic Association.

References

External links
Website

Public high schools in Arizona
Schools in Pinal County, Arizona
Charter schools in Arizona
Public middle schools in Arizona